Benover is a village in the Maidstone district of Kent, England. It lies on the B2162 road and is almost ten miles (16 km) by road south west of the town; its nearest village is Yalding . The local inn is The Woolpack.

External links

Villages in Kent